Schwaiger is a surname. Notable people with the surname include:

Brigitte Schwaiger (1949–2010), Austrian author
Doris Schwaiger, Austrian beach volleyball player
Hanuš Schwaiger, Czech painter
Rosl Schwaiger (1918–1970), Austrian operatic coloratura soprano
Stefanie Schwaiger, Austrian beach volleyball player
German toponymic surnames

Surnames from nicknames